Stuart Douglas Tate (born June 17, 1962) is a former pitcher in Major League Baseball. He played for the San Francisco Giants.

References

External links
, or Retrosheet, or Pura Pelota (Venezuelan Winter League)

1962 births
Living people
Auburn Tigers baseball players
Baseball players from Alabama
Clinton Giants players
Everett Giants players
Fresno Giants players
Major League Baseball pitchers
Navegantes del Magallanes players
American expatriate baseball players in Venezuela
Phoenix Firebirds players
San Francisco Giants players
Shreveport Captains players
Sportspeople from Huntsville, Alabama